The Ministry of Coal Industry (Minugleprom) was a government ministry in the Soviet Union.

A ukase of the Presidium Supreme Soviet USSR of 28 December 1948 created the all-union Ministry of the Coal Industry USSR by merging the Ministry of the Coal Industry of Western Regions USSR, the Ministry of the Coal Industry of Eastern Regions USSR, and the Ministry for Construction of Fuel Enterprises USSR.

Early Soviet predecessor-organisations included the Main Fuel Administration, founded in 1918.
The Soviet coal industry formed part of the all-union People's Commissariat of Heavy Industry (established in 1932). A ukase of the Presidium of the Supreme Soviet of the USSR on 24 January 1939 established the all-union People's Commissariat of Fuel Industry, which included the coal, shale and petroleum industries. A ukase of 12 October 1939 subdivided the all-union People's Commissariat of Fuel Industry into the all-union People's Commissariat of the Coal Industry USSR and the all-union People's Commissariat of Petroleum Industry USSR.

The all-union People's Commissariat of the Coal Industry USSR was split by a 19 January 1946 ukase into the all-union People's Commissariat of the Coal Industry of Western Regions USSR and the all-union People's Commissariat of the Coal industry of Eastern Regions USSR. A ukase of 28 January 1946 established the People's Commissariat for Construction of Fuel Enterprises USSR. The three commissariats became ministries on 15 March 1946.

List of ministers
Source:

References 

Coal Industry
1948 establishments in the Soviet Union